The Taxi Mystery is a 1926 American silent mystery film directed by Fred Windemere and starring Edith Roberts, Robert Agnew and Virginia Pearson.

Cast
Edith Roberts asNancy Cornell / Vera Norris
Robert Agnew as 	Harry Canby
Virginia Pearson as Mrs. Blaine Jameson
Phillips Smalley as Willoughby Thomson
Bertram Grassby as 	Fred Norris

References

Bibliography
Munden, Kenneth White. The American Film Institute Catalog of Motion Pictures Produced in the United States, Part 1. University of California Press, 1997.

External links

1926 films
1926 mystery films
American black-and-white films
American mystery films
American silent feature films
Films directed by Fred Windemere
1920s English-language films
1920s American films
Silent mystery films